Derrick LaRon Ward (born August 30, 1980) is a former American football running back in the National Football League (NFL). He was drafted by the New York Jets in the seventh round of the 2004 NFL Draft and played for the New York Giants, Tampa Bay Buccaneers and Houston Texans.  He played college football at Fresno State University and Ottawa University.

Ward earned a Super Bowl ring with the Giants in Super Bowl XLII, beating the New England Patriots. He is the cousin of former Patriots running back J.R. Redmond.

Early years
Ward attended Valley View High School in Moreno Valley, California and was a letterman in football.  In football, as a senior, he posted 1,100 rushing yards, 973 receiving yards, and 17 touchdowns, was an All-Riverside County choice, won All-CIF honors, was the Team Co/MVP, and was named the Sun Belt League Offensive MVP.

College career
For his collegiate career, he rushed 460 times for 3,152 yards (6.9-yard avg.) and 39 touchdowns and caught seven passes for 96 yards (13.7-yard avg.).

Fresno State
He gained 1,091 yards with 11 touchdowns on 197 carries (5.5-yard avg.) and caught three passes for 49 yards (16.3-yard avg.) in 20 games at Fresno State.  Ward was ruled academically ineligible to play at Fresno State in 1998, he earned Freshman All-America honors the following year despite playing with a broken right hand.  He was limited to only seven games for the Bulldogs in 2000 due to a knee injury.  His Fresno State career ended when he was again ruled ineligible to play in 2001 and 2002 due to academics.

Ottawa
Ward transferred to Ottawa University in Kansas for his final year in 2003, when he set NAIA single-season records with 2,061 rushing yards, 28 touchdowns and 7.8 yards per carry (263 attempts).  Also had 47 yards on four receptions (11.8-yard avg.) in ten games at Ottawa.

Professional career

New York Jets
Ward was selected by the New York Jets in the seventh round of the 2004 NFL Draft.

On September 5, 2004, Ward was released by the Jets.

New York Giants

Ward had a good season in 2007 rushing for 602 yards on 125 touches, averaging 4.8 yards per carry and scoring three touchdowns.

On March 14, 2008, Ward was re-signed by the Giants.

Because of their success in the backfield during the 2008 season, Ward and his teammates Brandon Jacobs and Ahmad Bradshaw were jokingly referred to as Earth (Jacobs), Wind (Ward) and Fire (Bradshaw).

On December 21, 2008, Ward led the Giants' rushing attack with 215 rushing yards in a 34–28 overtime victory over the Carolina Panthers to clinch homefield advantage throughout the 2009 NFL Playoffs.  He finished the season with 1,025 yards, making him and Brandon Jacobs the fifth pair of teammates to rush for 1,000 yards in a single season.  The strong performance by both running backs is credited to high grade run blocking by the Giants offensive line.

While playing with the Giants, Ward was a resident of Weehawken, New Jersey.

Tampa Bay Buccaneers
Ward was signed by the Tampa Bay Buccaneers on March 2, 2009. He signed a four-year contract worth $17 million.  In the 2009 season for the Buccaneers he rushed 114 times for 409 yards and 1 touchdown.
Ward was cut from the team on August 31, 2010.

Houston Texans
On September 4, 2010, Ward was signed by the Houston Texans.
On July 3, 2012, Ward announced his retirement via Twitter.

References

External links
Official website 
Tampa Bay Buccaneers bio 
New York Giants bio

1980 births
Living people
Players of American football from Los Angeles
People from Weehawken, New Jersey
African-American players of American football
American football running backs
Fresno State Bulldogs football players
Ottawa Braves football players
New York Jets players
New York Giants players
Tampa Bay Buccaneers players
Houston Texans players
21st-century African-American sportspeople
20th-century African-American people